Harry Werner Storz (3 March 1904 – 13 August 1982) was a German sprinter who competed at the 1928 Summer Olympics. He won a silver medal in the 4 × 400 m relay and finished fifth in the individual 400 m event.

References

1904 births
1982 deaths
German male sprinters
Olympic athletes of Germany
Athletes (track and field) at the 1928 Summer Olympics
Olympic silver medalists for Germany
Sportspeople from Halle (Saale)
Medalists at the 1928 Summer Olympics
Olympic silver medalists in athletics (track and field)